Jill Carnes is an Elephant 6-related musician and artist.  She performs as Thimble Circus with Eric Harris, and self-released one album under that name, Lullaby for Worriers, in 2003. The album features appearances by Elephant 6 artists and associates Peter Erchick, Chris Jolly, Heather McIntosh, Scott Spillane, and Jeff Mangum.

References 

The Elephant 6 Recording Company artists
Musicians from Georgia (U.S. state)
Artists from Georgia (U.S. state)
Living people
Year of birth missing (living people)